Odhise Kristo Grillo (1932–2003) was an Albanian writer of children's books.

Biography
Grillo was born in 1932 in Vuno, where he went to elementary school. He completed middle school and high school in the capital Tirana. In 1962 he graduated in Faculty of Philology as well as Faculty of Law at the University of Tirana.

He started to work at the humor magazine, Hosteni, and later at the Naim Frashëri Publishing House as an editor for children's publications until he retired, although he went back to editing and writing at the Publishing House "Toena". He had publications in the magazines Drita, "Nëntori", "Ylli", "Zëri i Rinisë", Hosteni, Pionieri, "Fatosi", "Yllkat", and "Bota e fëmijëve". He was president of the International Association of Children's Writers, also a professor at the University of Tirana and the Aleksandër Xhuvani University. He was a recipient of many national literary  prizes in Albania. Internationally he was translated into Greek, Macedonian, Italian, French, Dutch, and Arabic.

In 2013 Milaim Nelaj published a monograph on Grillo.

Odhise Kristo Grillo (21 March 1932 – 24 September 2003): when requiring the highest mountains in Albanian landscape, we list them respectively as: Korabi (2751 asl) with its 3 peaks, Jezerca (2694 asl) with 13 peaks over 2300 m, the top of Gramozi, Çukapeçi (2523 asl), Papingu at the top of Nemërçka (2489 asl) and Tomorri 2416 m, the oldest mountain , which is also known as the Albanian Olympus. When talking of Albanian writers for children , Odhise Kristo Grillo is among the five highest mountains. – See more at: http://gazetadielli.com/odise-grillo-mesuesi-i-shkrimtareve-shqiptare-per-femije/
/#sthash.9m5yl3UC.dpuf / Albert Habazaj studiues, 30 July 2015

Grillo died on September 24, 2003 in Tirana, Albania.

Main works
 Shtatë ngjyrat
 Ai që mundi perandorin
 Balada e burrave të Vunoit
 Balada e lirisë
 Një zogë e një lule
 Zërat e fëmijërisë
 Njeriu i natës
 Pushkë në bregdetë
 Çamçakëzi
 Një njeri u bë majmunë
 Përtacukët
 Historia e Skënderbeut
 Lahuta e malësisë
 Tradhti në sarajet Topiase
 Don Kishoti i Mançës
 Erdhi dite e Arbrit
 Thike Pas Shpine
 Jeta ime pas vdekjes

References 

1932 births
2003 deaths
Albanian children's writers
People from Himara
University of Tirana alumni
Academic staff of the University of Tirana
Academic staff of the University of Elbasan